The 1982–83 Villanova Wildcats men's basketball team represented Villanova University during the 1982–83 NCAA Division I men's basketball season. The head coach was Rollie Massimino. The team played its home games at Villanova Field House in Villanova, Pennsylvania, and was a member of the Big East Conference.  The team tied for the regular season Big East title and reached the Elite Eight of the NCAA tournament before falling to high-flying Houston, famously known as "Phi Slama Jama." Villanova finished with a 24–8 record (12–4 Big East).

Roster

Schedule and results

|-
!colspan=9 style=| Regular season

|-
!colspan=9 style=| Big East tournament

|-
!colspan=9 style=| NCAA tournament

Rankings

Awards and honors
John Pinone – Robert V. Geasey Trophy (3x)

NBA Draft

References

Villanova
Villanova
Villanova Wildcats men's basketball seasons
1982 in sports in Pennsylvania
1983 in sports in Pennsylvania